Martin government may refer to:
27th Canadian Ministry (2004–2006), led by Paul Martin
32nd Government of Ireland (2020–present), led by Micheál Martin